Joan Cañellas Reixach (born 30 September 1986) is a Spanish handball player for Kadetten Schaffhausen and the Spain national team.

Cañellas scored 50 goals for Spain at the 2014 European Championship in Denmark. He was the tournament's top scorer.

While playing in Madrid, he also studied pharmacy at University of Barcelona and Universidad Complutense de Madrid. Joan is a member of a pharmacist dynasty, six of his family members are pharmacists.

Honours and awards

F.C.Barcelona
 Spanish Liga: 2005–06
 Spanish Cup: 2007
 Spanish Supercup: 2007

BM. Ciudad Real
 Spanish Liga: 2009–2010
 Spanish Cup: 2010
 Super Globe: 2010
 Asobal Cup: 2010
 Spanish Supercup: 2010
 EHF Champions League Finalist: 2010–11

BM. Atletico de Madrid
 Super Globe: 2012
 Spanish SuperCup: 2011
 Spanish Cup: 2011, 2012
 EHF Champions League Finalist: 2011–12

THW Kiel
 Handball-Bundesliga: 2014–2015
 DHB-Supercup: 2015, 2016

Vardar Skopje
 EHF Champions League Winner: 2016–17
 Macedonian Handball Super League: 2016–17, 2017–18
 Macedonian Handball Cup: 2016, 2017
 SEHA Liga: 2016, 2017

MOL-Pick Szeged
 Magyar Kézilabdakupa: 2018–2019
Magyar Kézilabdaliga: 2020–2021

Individual
 MVP of the SEHA League Final Four: 2017

References

External links

1986 births
Living people
Handball players from Catalonia
Spanish male handball players
Expatriate handball players
Spanish expatriate sportspeople in Germany
Spanish expatriate sportspeople in Hungary
Spanish expatriate sportspeople in North Macedonia
Liga ASOBAL players
BM Granollers players
FC Barcelona Handbol players
BM Ciudad Real players
Handball players at the 2012 Summer Olympics
Olympic handball players of Spain
THW Kiel players
RK Vardar players
SC Pick Szeged players
Handball-Bundesliga players
People from Vallès Oriental
Sportspeople from the Province of Barcelona